Ectogenesis (from the Greek ἐκτός, "outside," and genesis) is the growth of an organism in an artificial environment outside the body in which it would normally be found, such as the growth of an embryo or fetus outside the mother's body, or the growth of bacteria outside the body of a host. The term was coined by British scientist J.B.S. Haldane in 1924.

Human embryos and fetuses

Ectogenesis of human embryos and fetuses would require an artificial uterus. An artificial uterus would have to be supplied with nutrients and oxygen from some source to nurture the fetus, as well as dispose of waste material. There would likely be a need for an interface between such a supplier, filling this function of the placenta. An artificial uterus, as a replacement organ, could be used to assist women with damaged, diseased or removed uteri to allow the fetus to be conceived to term. It also has the potential to move the threshold of fetal viability to a much earlier stage of pregnancy. This would have implications for the ongoing controversy regarding human reproductive rights.

Ectogenesis could also be a means by which homosexual and single men could have genetic offspring without the use of surrogate pregnancy or a sperm donor, and allow women to have children without going through the pregnancy cycle.

Synthetic embryo 

In 2022, Scientists of the Weizmann Institute of Science created early "embryo-like structures'" from mice stem cells. The world's first synthetic embryo does not require sperm, eggs nor fertilization and were grown from only embryonic stem cells (ESCs) or also from  stem cells other than ESCs. The structure had an intestinal tract, early brain and a beating heart and a placenta with a yolk sac around the embryo. The researchers said it could lead to better understanding of organ and tissue development, new sources of cells and tissues for human transplantation. However, human synthetic embryos are a long ways off. Their research was published by Cell on August 1, 2022.

Also in August 2022, a study described how University of Cambridge and the same Weizmann Institute of Science scientists created a synthetic embryo with a brain and a beating heart by using stem cells (also some stem cells other than ESCs). No human eggs nor sperm were used. They showed natural-like development and some survived until day 8.5 where early organogenesis, including formation of foundations of a brain, occurs. Scientists hope it can be used to create synthetic human organs for transplantation.

The embryos grew in vitro and subsequently ex utero in an artificial womb. The two studies were considered a milestone achievement, but the research is controversial. Potential applications include "uncovering the role of different genes in birth defects or developmental disorders", gaining "direct insight into the origins of a new life", "understand[ing] why some pregnancies fail", and developing sources "of organs and tissues for people who need them". The term 'synthetic embryo' in the title of the second study was later changed to the alternative term, "Embryo model".

Bioethical considerations
The development of artificial uteri and ectogenesis raises a few bioethical and legal considerations, and also has important implications for reproductive rights and the abortion debate.

Artificial uteri may expand the range of fetal viability, raising questions about the role that fetal viability plays within abortion law. Within severance theory, for example, abortion rights only include the right to remove the fetus, and do not always extend to the termination of the fetus. If transferring the fetus from a woman's womb to an artificial uterus is possible, the choice to terminate a pregnancy in this way could provide an alternative to aborting the fetus.

There are also theoretical concerns that children who develop in an artificial uterus may lack "some essential bond with their mothers that other children have"; a secondary issue to woman's rights over their own body.

In the 1970 book The Dialectic of Sex, feminist Shulamith Firestone wrote that differences in biological reproductive roles are a source of gender inequality. Firestone singled out pregnancy and childbirth, making the argument that an artificial womb would free "women from the tyranny of their reproductive biology."

See also
 Ectopic pregnancy
 Endometrium
 IVF
 Placenta
 Uterus
 Amniotic fluid
 Apheresis
 ECMO
 Hemodialysis
 Liver dialysis
 TPN
 Tissue engineering

References

Further reading

Developmental biology